Fitzwilliam Square is a Georgian garden square in the south of central Dublin, Ireland. It was the last of the five Georgian squares in Dublin to be built, and is the smallest.

The middle of the square is composed of a private park, which for more than 200 years has been accessible only to keyholders, mostly the residents and owners of the 69 houses on the square, some of whom pay almost €1,000 a year for the privilege. Fitzwilliam Square East makes up part of Dublin's Georgian mile.

History 
The square was developed by Richard FitzWilliam, 7th Viscount FitzWilliam, hence the name. It was designed from 1789 and laid out in 1792. The centre of the square was enclosed in 1813 through an Act of the Parliament of Ireland. To the north is the much larger Merrion Square, with which Richard FitzWilliam was also involved. The square was a popular place for the Irish Social Season of aristocrats entertaining in Dublin between January and Saint Patrick's Day each year.

Shootings took place in the square during Bloody Sunday of 1920. Sir Thomas O'Shaughnessy (1850–1933), the last Recorder of Dublin, lived in Fitzwilliam Square and died there on 7 March 1933.

In 1975, Bord na Móna were granted permission to demolish five early 19th-century houses on the edge of the square, with plans to construct a modern office block on the site. The plans were later dropped.

See also 
 List of streets and squares in Dublin

References

External links 

 Irish architecture information (including photographs of doorways)
 DublinTourist.com information

Squares in Dublin (city)
1792 establishments in Ireland
Georgian architecture in Ireland